The 2011 Busan Open Challenger Tennis was a professional tennis tournament played on hard courts. It was the ninth edition of the tournament which was part of the 2011 ATP Challenger Tour. It took place in Busan, South Korea between 9 and 15 May 2011.

Singles main-draw entrants

Seeds

 Rankings are as of May 2, 2011.

Other entrants
The following players received wildcards into the singles main draw:
  Jeong Suk-young
  Kim Hyun-joon
  Lu Yen-hsun
  Nam Ji-sung

The following players received entry from the qualifying draw:
  An Jae-sung
  Mikhail Ledovskikh
  Toshihide Matsui
  Takao Suzuki

Champions

Singles

 Dudi Sela def.  Tatsuma Ito, 6–2, 6–7(5), 6–3

Doubles

 Im Kyu-tae /  Danai Udomchoke def.  Jamie Baker /  Vasek Pospisil, 6–4, 6–4

External links
Official Website
ITF Search
ATP official site

Busan Open Challenger Tennis
Busan Open
May 2011 sports events in South Korea
Busan